Holliday Petroglyphs (23MN1) is a historic archeological site located near Holliday, Monroe County, Missouri.  This site consists of a group of petroglyph (carved rock art) panels identified in 1944. Stone tools and pottery shards were found near the rock art.

It was added to the National Register of Historic Places in 1974.

References

Petroglyphs in Missouri
Archaeological sites on the National Register of Historic Places in Missouri
Buildings and structures in Monroe County, Missouri
National Register of Historic Places in Monroe County, Missouri